Ablaye Sy (born 21 August 1994) is a  Mauritanian footballer plays as a defender for Al-Ansar and the Mauritania national team.

On 27 July 2021, Sy joined Al-Ansar.

References

1994 births
Living people
Mauritanian footballers
Mauritanian expatriate footballers
Mauritania international footballers
FC Nouadhibou players
Jeddah Club players
Al-Ansar FC (Medina) players
Association football defenders
Saudi First Division League players
Saudi Second Division players
Expatriate footballers in Saudi Arabia
Mauritanian expatriate sportspeople in Saudi Arabia